Rimbey-Rocky Mountain House-Sundre is a provincial electoral district in central Alberta, Canada. The district was created in the 2010 boundary redistribution and is mandated to return a single member to the Legislative Assembly of Alberta using the first past the post voting system. It includes the towns of Bentley, Eckville, Rimbey, Rocky Mountain House, and Sundre.

History
The electoral district was created in the 2010 Alberta boundary re-distribution. It was created from the old electoral district of Rocky Mountain House which was expanded to include the town of Rimbey, Alberta which was previously in Lacombe-Ponoka. The riding also gained some land west of Sylvan Lake.

Boundary history

Electoral history

The predecessor Rocky Mountain House had returned Progressive Conservative MLAs since 1971. From 1940 to 1970 popular Social Credit MLA Alfred Hooke represented the district. The current incumbent is Jason Nixon who won the seat for the Wildrose Party in the 2015 election.

Elections

2012 general election

2015 general election

2019 general election

Senate nominee results

2012 Senate nominee election district results

Student vote results

2012 election

References

External links
Elections Alberta

Alberta provincial electoral districts